Abraham Isaac (1828 1906) was a clergyman in the Church of Ireland  in the second half of the nineteenth century and the first decade of the twentieth.

Isaac was educated at Trinity College Dublin. Rector Valentia 183047, After a curacy at Ardfert he held incumbencies at Kilcolman, Killiney, Valentia and Kilgobbin. He was  Dean of Ardfert from 1895 until his death on 4 March 1906.

References

Deans of Ardfert
Alumni of Trinity College Dublin
1828 births
1906 deaths